Pierce W. Lyden (January 8, 1908 – October 10, 1998) was an American actor best known for his work in television and film Westerns.

Early life
Lyden was born in a sod house on a ranch near Hildreth, Nebraska on January 8, 1908. The son of a horse buyer for the U.S. Army cavalry, he acquired as a youngster riding skills that later made it possible for him to do his own stunts as an actor in Hollywood westerns.

Education
He attended high school in Naponee, Nebraska, and acted in several plays there; he graduated from the University of Nebraska School of Music and Fine Arts in 1927 and later studied at the Emerson College of Oratory in Boston.

Early years
Lyden supported himself in these early years by playing romantic leads in stock company productions in Lincoln and on the road; he appeared in a few Chautauqua presentations. Soon after graduating from the University of Nebraska, he joined the United Chautauqua System, taking the leading role in its production of The Family Upstairs.

Hollywood

When talking movies eclipsed live theater presentations in small towns, Pierce Lyden went on to Hollywood in 1932. There he played villains’ roles in B Western films, quickly becoming typecast as a "bad guy," specializing in fight scenes. He appeared in Saturday serials called cliffhangers as well as in feature films and television series.

The number of his movie roles has been estimated at between 300 and 400 (actors who did not have major parts were not listed in film credits); he also appeared in about 150 episodes of The Cisco Kid, Wild Bill Hickok, Bat Masterson, The Lone Ranger, and other television series.

He worked with the most famous Western movie actors, including Roy Rogers, Gene Autry, and Hopalong Cassidy. He was Photo Press Fan Poll "Villain of the Year" in 1944.

Retirement
In 1962, as the popularity of Westerns lessened, Lyden retired in Orange, California, where he had lived throughout his acting career. He wrote "Action Shots" about film personalities for the Orange County, California, Register, and the film industry magazine Classic Images; he published five books about his career and the making of films in his era. In his later years he was regularly invited to film festivals in the U.S. and abroad. Honors awarded him included membership in the Cowboy Hall of Fame and Heritage Foundation (1979) and the Golden Boot Award (1992).

In 1989 Naponee, Nebraska, named a street for him and held a Pierce Lyden film festival; in 1997 he received Nebraska's Buffalo Bill Award. In 1996, a Golden Palm Star on the Palm Springs, California, Walk of Stars was dedicated to him.

Death
Lyden died on October 10, 1998, aged 90, and was buried at Fairhaven Memorial Park in Santa Ana, California.

Personal life
Lyden had one son, Donald Pierce Lyden, an attorney who had three children with his wife Kathleen. 
Lyden was married January 29, 1929, but received an annulment March 18, 1931, alleging that he had not seen his wife, Margerie Ann, since two hours after the wedding.

Selected filmography
 Black Hills Express (1943)
 Trigger Law (1944)
 Roll on Texas Moon (1946)
 Trigger Fingers (1946)
 Raiders of the South (1947)
 Song of the Wasteland (1947)
 Valley of Fear (1947)
 Blazing Across the Pecos (1948)
 Silver Trails (1948) 
 Back Trail (1948)
 Dead Man's Gold (1948)
 The Traveling Saleswoman (1950)
 Stagecoach Driver (1951)
 Canyon Raiders (1951)
 Kansas Territory (1952)
 Waco (1952)
 The Women of Pitcairn Island (1956)
 Sergeant Preston of the Yukon (1957)

References

External links
 Pierce Lyden papers at the Nebraska State Historical Society
 

1908 births
1998 deaths
20th-century American male actors
American male film actors
American male television actors
Male Western (genre) film actors
Male film serial actors
People from Franklin County, Nebraska
Male actors from Nebraska
University of Nebraska alumni
Emerson College alumni
Burials in California